Glory be to God on High can refer to:
A translation of Gloria in excelsis Deo into English, which has spawned different versions with different melodies and lyrics
A remake of Michael Row the Boat Ashore, with different lyrics but the same melody